Pickled fruit refers to fruit that has been pickled. Pickling is the process of food preservation by either anaerobic fermentation in brine or immersion in vinegar. Many types of fruit are pickled. Some examples include peaches, apples, crab apple, pears, plums, grapes, currant, tomato and olives. Vinegar may also be prepared from fruit, such as apple cider vinegar.

For thousands of years in many parts of the world, pickles have been used as the main method to preserve fruits and other foods. There is evidence that thousands of years ago in Mesopotamia, Egypt, Greece, Rome and China people pickled different foods for preservation. Mayan culture in America used tobacco to preserve food, specifically to make pickled peppers. In ancient times the different cultures used salt that was found naturally and water to make the brine, which they used to pickle foods that cannot be eaten naturally, such as olives and some grains.

Peaches

Pickled peaches may be prepared from medium-sized, non-melting clingstone peaches that are small-seeded. In the United States prior to around 1960, some were prepared from small, unripe freestone peaches. Flavour may be added to the pickle using 'sweet spices', such as cinnamon, cloves and allspice, or savoury pickling spices, such as peppercorns and coriander. Pickled peaches may be used to accompany meats and in salads, and also have other uses.

Pears 
Pickled pears may be prepared with sugar, cinnamon, cloves and allspice to add flavor, and may be referred to as spiced pears. They may be prepared from underripe pears. Pickled pears may be used to accompany dishes such as roasts and salads, among others.

Grapes 
To pickle grapes it is necessary to use white wine vinegar, water, kosher salt, sugar, cloves garlic, rosemary and dried chili flakes. Garlic, chili flakes and some other species make grapes a unique flavor.

Cantaloupe 
The cantaloupe is a summer season fruit, which can be pickled and refrigerated to be able to eat it during the rest of the year. The cantaloupe can be pickled using champagne vinegar, hot water, granulated sugar, ice, mustard seed, celery seed, Aleppo pepper and cinnamon stick.

List of pickled fruits

 Apple
 Crab apple
 Apricot
 Umeboshi
 Barberry
 Blackberry
 Blueberry
 Caper
 Cherry
 Citrus peel
 Currant
 Dates
 Damson
 Fig
 Grape
 Mango pickle
 Aavakaaya
 Nata de coco – fermented coconut juice
 Nata de pina – fermented pineapple juice
 Olives 
 Orange
 Peach
 Nectarine
 Pear
 Peppadew
 Pickled lime
 Pickled pepper
 Plum
 Preserved lemon
 Prunes 
 Strawberry
 Tomato
 Watermelon may be pickled, as well as watermelon rind.

By country
In Malaysia, some fruits are pickled when they are unripe, such as belimbing, kedondong, chermai, lime, pineapple, papaya, mango and nutmeg.

In Mexico, there are two phrases to describe a "pickle": the term "escabechar or encurtir" is used when food is pickled by vinegar; when salt is the main ingredient for pickling, it is called "escabeche or salmuera."

The word "vinegar" is of French origin (Vin - Aigre), comprising "vino-agrio" in Spanish and literally "wine-sour" in English.  At its origin, vinegar was obtained as the result from the fermentation of wine which was sour. 

In Mexico, vinegar is obtained in large part from the fermentation of fruits such as pineapple and apple; people use this naturally sourced vinegar to pickle fruits and vegetables in the home. With many various peppers, the pickle pepper is very popular in Mexico — the pepper being one of the main products made both at home and by the pickling industry. Some states in Mexico such as Oaxaca and Puebla use homemade fermented pineapple-vinegar or sour brine to pickle fruits such as mangoes, membrillos and some cactus — the resulting pickles are then used as ingredients in traditional cooking.

See also

References

Pickles
Food preservation
Fermented foods
Condiments